The Minister of State for Children was a junior ministerial post in the Departments of Health and Children, Justice and Law Reform and Education and Skills of the Government of Ireland. The Minister of State worked together with the various senior Ministers in these departments and had special responsibility for children's affairs.

The first Minister of State with responsibility for Children was appointed on 20 December 1994. There has not been a Minister of State with this responsibility since the creation of the full cabinet position of Minister for Children and Youth Affairs in March 2011.

Minister of State with responsibility for Children 1994–2011

Notes

References

Children
Ministries established in 1994